Trial Run is a 1984 New Zealand film directed by Melanie Read starring Annie Whittle.
The film is a feminist revision of the thriller genre.

Plot summary
Rosemary Edmonds, a photographer and runner, must temporarily leave her husband and two children when she moves into a remote coastal cottage to carry out an assignment to photograph a colony of rare penguins. It soon becomes apparent that she is being stalked in the cottage by an unknown tormentor. In a twist ending, the "stalker" is revealed to be Rosemary's own teenage son.

Cast

References

External links
 
 
 Trial Run at NZ On Screen

1984 films
1984 thriller films
1980s New Zealand films
Films set in New Zealand
Films shot in New Zealand
New Zealand thriller films